Sorkunlu can refer to:

 Sorkunlu, Aziziye
 Sorkunlu, Aydıntepe